Skorpa is an uninhabited island in the municipality of Herøy in Møre og Romsdal county Norway.

There are no longer any permanent residents on the island, and today Skorpa is best known for vacation cottages and the herd of wild goats that live there. The farm Matrikkelgård on Skorpa has the Norwegian farm registration number 1.

World War II
Skorpa was an important contact point for the Shetland bus and for other allied military traffic during World War II.  The island served as a station for agents and resistance personnel both to meet and to hide. Instructors, weapons, and sabotage material were transported to the Norwegian resistance forces. For many who departed to Great Britain this was the last stop, just as it was the first stop for many agents on the way into Norway.

In 1940, retreating British soldiers were hidden here, before being evacuated to Shetland in fishing boats. 1941 was the first year that Norwegian boats covered the route between Norway and Shetland. Leif Larsen (popularly known as Shetland Larsen), a famous Shetland Bus captain, was the first captain on this route. On November 17, 1943, the HNoMS Hitra, a converted U.S. submarine chaser, began to cover the route, shortly joined by the MS Bergholm.

Most allied activities on the northern coast lasted only 7–8 months, but Skorpa operated throughout the war. German soldiers made many house-to-house inspections, but never found any illegal equipment such as radios. A number of the residents were notably active in the resistance, including Gerhard and Sina Skorpen, who departed to England under the cover that they had drowned. Gerhard afterwards became a crew member of another converted U.S. submarine chaser, the KNM Vigra, upon which Leif Larsen served as skipper. At the close of the war they returned to Skorpa.

See also
List of islands of Norway

References

Herøy, Møre og Romsdal
Islands of Møre og Romsdal
Military history of Norway during World War II
Uninhabited islands of Norway
Sunnmøre